(Op. 62) is a 1959 choral work on a Latin text by the English composer Benjamin Britten. It was commissioned by Paul Sacher for the quincentenary of the University of Basel. He conducted the premiere on 1 July 1960.

History and text
The cantata, completed in March 1959, was written for the 500th anniversary of the University of Basel on 1 July the following year. Britten wrote out the text for the work on the pages of his old preparatory-school German exercise book. He later used the same book to plan his War Requiem.

The work was premiered at the University of Basel on 1 July 1960, conducted by Paul Sacher; the performers were Agnes Giebel, Elsa Cavelti, Peter Pears, Heinz Rehfuss, the Basler Kammerchor, the Sterk'scher Privatchor, and the Basler Kammerorchester. The British premiered was by the Cambridge University Musical Society in November, a few months after Britten received an honorary doctorate from the University.

Composition
The piece is scored for four vocal soloists (soprano, alto or contralto, tenor, and bass), a four-part choir, two flutes, piccolo, two oboes, two clarinets in B-flat, two bassoons, four horns, two trumpets in C, three trombones, tuba, strings, timpani, four percussionists, two harps, and pianoforte.

The work is in two parts and has thirteen total sections.
Pars 1

Recitative (tenor)
Arioso (bass)
Duettino (soprano and alto)
Recitative (tenor)
Scherzo
Pars 2

 (alto and bass)

Recitative (tenor)

Cantata academica is formally a work of serialism, although only on a large scale, "so tightly connected with the form that it is the form itself". This reflects Britten's intention to be deliberately "clever" with the work; he noted in a letter to Wyss that the piece is "full of academic devices for the edification of the performers". The final section is "but a unifying return to the opening"; each of the others has a single "ruling note", corresponding to the 12-note series of the work, which serves as an ostinato or pedal tone for the section.

Adaptations
The movement  was adapted for two 1973 compositions by Richard Rodney Bennett dedicated to Britten: a concerto for orchestra and a work called Alba for organ. It was also used as the basis for a 1963 collaborative composition by Bennett, Nicholas Maw, and Malcolm Williamson, called Reflections on a theme of Benjamin Britten.

References

1959 compositions
Compositions by Benjamin Britten
Cantatas
Music commissioned by Paul Sacher
University of Basel